Primrose Brook is a tributary of the Passaic River in the Jockey Hollow section of the Morristown National Historical Park of northern New Jersey in the United States.

Primrose Brook rises near Post House Road in Harding, flowing South South East through the Great Swamp National Wildlife Refuge to where it joins Great Brook in Harding and then empties into the Passaic River.

See also
List of rivers of New Jersey

External links
Streams of the Great Swamp Watershed: Primrose Brook

Tributaries of the Passaic River
Rivers of New Jersey
Rivers of Morris County, New Jersey
Rivers of Somerset County, New Jersey